The 1985 Virginia lieutenant gubernatorial election was held on November 5, 1985. Democratic nominee Douglas Wilder defeated Republican nominee John Chichester with 51.84% of the vote.

General election

Candidates
Douglas Wilder, Democratic, State Senator
John Chichester, Republican, State Senator

Results

References

Virginia
1985
Gubernatorial